RPD International (Rapid Product Development) is a design and manufacturing firm founded in 2012 by a British entrepreneur, Josh Valman. RPD helps companies to develop and manufacture new products.

RPD operates a global supply chain to develop and launch new products in consumer electronic, consumer medical and consumer goods. RPD works with clients such as Unilever, GSK and Vodafone. 
RPD also runs a program known as Accelerate, this program focusses on helping startups and SME businesses launch new products and compete with larger businesses in manufacturing.

History
RPD was founded in 2012 to simplify the process of developing new products, particularly in startup-scale supply chain.

BBC Robot Wars
Since March 2017, RPD competes in Robot Wars with a robot named Rapid.

In Series 9 of BBC Series, Robot Wars, Rapid suffered a mechanical fault and withdrew from the competition. 

RPD returned to Robot Wars in series 10, reaching the finals episode. 
Rapid was beaten by prior year winner: Carbide, suffering significant damage resulting in a large lithium fire.

References

International management consulting firms